2022 in the Philippines details notable events that occurred in the Philippines in 2022. The COVID-19 pandemic, which largely defined the preceding two years (2020 and 2021), continued into 2022.

Incumbents

 President:
 Rodrigo Duterte (PDP–Laban) (until June 30)
 Bongbong Marcos (PFP) (from June 30)
 Vice President:
 Leni Robredo (Liberal) (until June 30)
 Sara Duterte (Lakas–CMD) (from June 30)
 Congress:
 Senate President:
 18th Congress: Tito Sotto (NPC) (until June 1)
 19th Congress: Migz Zubiri (Independent) (from July 25)
 House Speaker:
 18th Congress: Lord Allan Velasco (PDP–Laban) (until June 1)
 19th Congress: Martin Romualdez (Lakas-CMD) (from July 25)
 Chief Justice: Alexander Gesmundo

Ongoing events
 COVID-19 pandemic
 Pharmally scandal
 Philippine sugar crisis

Events

January
 January 1 – Republic Act No. 11467, which increases the excise tax on alcohol products, electronic cigarettes, and heated tobacco products, takes effect.
 January 6 – President Rodrigo Duterte signs Republic Act No. 11642, that seeks to simplify the process of adoption, as thousands of children remained under government care while awaiting permanent homes.
 January 7:
 Monsignors Lope Robredillo, Eutiquio "Euly" Belizar Jr., and Romeo Solidon, three priests of the Roman Catholic Diocese of Borongan in Eastern Samar, are appointed by Pope Francis as the "Chaplains to His Holiness".
 Juanito Itaas, convicted in 1991 for his involvement in the 1989 killing of United States Army Col. James Rowe, and the country's "longest held political prisoner" for 32 years, is released from prison through a court order allowing him to benefit from the Good Conduct Time Allowance (Republic Act No. 10592).
 January 11 – President Rodrigo Duterte signs Republic Act No. 11643, which grants survivorship benefits to the legitimate spouse and dependent children of deceased retired members of the National Prosecution Service.
 January 14:
 The National Bureau of Investigation files murder complaints against 17 cops over the killing of two of nine activists killed during the "Bloody Sunday" operations on March 7, 2021.
 President Rodrigo Duterte signs Republic Act Nos. 11644 and 11645, declaring the city of Carcar in Cebu and the town of San Vicente in Ilocos Sur as heritage zones.
 January 18 – Five persons who were involved in the reported fraudulent schemes targeting BDO Unibank Inc., in December 2021, were arrested by the National Bureau of Investigation in an entrapment operation in Mabalacat, Pampanga. On January 26, DOJ indicts four individuals following its investigation of the fraud that hit the said bank. 
 January 20 – The Department of Justice indicts nine police officers over the killings of former Calbayog mayor Ronaldo Aquino and his companions on March 8, 2021.

February
 February 4 – The International Astronomical Union names 7431 Jettaguilar, in honor of Dr. Jose Francisco "Jett" Aguilar, a medical doctor and amateur astronomer.
 February 5 – The United States Federal Bureau of Investigation publishes religious leader Apollo Quiboloy as one of the most wanted list for sex trafficking.
 February 18 – Dr. Natividad Castro, an advocate of Lumad communities in Mindanao, is arrested by members of Philippine National Police (PNP) in San Juan City. On June 16, the Bayugan Regional Trial Court (RTC), having charges of kidnapping and serious illegal detention case against her dismissed on March 25, orders the re-arrest.
 February 23 – The Philippine government through the Anti-Terrorism Council formally declares 16 organizations which has supposedly functioning as underground organizations of the communist groups as terrorists in its resolution dated January 26.
 February 24 – The Senate Committee on Public Order and Dangerous Drugs approves a resolution to suspend the operations of online cockfighting operators amid a series of disappearances linked to e-sabong.

March
 March 2 – Pres. Duterte signs Republic Act No. 11647, which will amend Foreign Investments Act of 1991 (RA No. 7042) and effectively eases several restrictions on foreign investment.
 March 4 – Pres. Duterte signs RA No. 11648, raising the age of sexual consent and for determining statutory rape, from 12 to 16.
 March 11 – Pres. Duterte signs RA No. 11650 requiring schools nationwide to provide free basic education and related services to learners with disabilities.
 March 21:
 Pres. Duterte signs RA No. 11659, amending the Public Service Act (Commonwealth Act No. 146) and allowing full foreign ownership in various, certain sectors.
 Pres. Duterte signs Executive Order No. 166, that adopted a 10-point policy agenda meant to accelerate and sustain the country's economic recovery from the COVID-19 pandemic.
 March 23 – The Philippine Atmospheric, Geophysical, and Astronomical Services Administration revises its definition of a super typhoon, as well as meanings of tropical cyclone wind signals, marking a shift in local forecasting.
 March 26 – Taal Volcano was placed on Alert Level 3 after its "main crater generated a short-lived phreatomagmatic burst," with plumes reaching as high as 1,500 meters.
 March 31 – The Philippine Air Force (PAF) introduces 1Lt. Jul Laiza Mae Camposano-Beran as the first female fighter pilot at the Basa Air Base, Floridablanca, Pampanga.

April
 April 8:
 Pres. Duterte signs Republic Act No. 11691, creating the Office of the Judiciary Marshalls that would protect members and personnel of the judiciary.
 Pres. Duterte signs five laws declaring five separate areas nationwide, including Mount Pulag, Mount Arayat, and Tirad Pass, as protected landscapes.
 April 9–12 – Tropical Storm Megi (Agaton) devastates Visayas and major parts of Mindanao; reported death toll is 212, mostly from landslides occurred in Baybay and Abuyog in Leyte, while 132 are still missing. Damages are estimated at almost 5 billion pesos.
 April 10 – Republic Act No. 11683, is lapsed into law which seeks to ease conversion of towns into cities but was signed by President Rodrigo Duterte on April 11. The new cityhood law amends Section 450 of Republic Act No. 7160 also known as the Local Government Code of 1991, where a municipality will be exempted from the land and population requirements if it generates at least 100 million pesos for two consecutive years.
 April 12 – The Supreme Court announces the result of the first ever first digitized and decentralized bar examinations in the Philippines. A total of 8,241 examinees out of 11,402 takers passed the 2020/2021 Bar Examinations, which was dubbed as the "Biggest Bar Ever", for a 72.28% passing rate.
 April 13:
 Pres. Duterte signs Republic Act No. 11699, declaring August 30 as the National Press Freedom Day, a working holiday, in honor of Marcelo H. Del Pilar, the "Father of Philippine Journalism".
 President Rodrigo Duterte signs Republic Act No. 11708, that created the Metropolitan Davao Development Authority (MDDA).
 President Rodrigo Duterte signs Republic Act No. 11696, that providing compensation to the victims of the 2017 Marawi siege.
 President Rodrigo Duterte signs Republic Act No. 11709, that granting a three-year fixed term for key officials of the Armed Forces of the Philippines, including the chief of staff.
 April 19 – The Anti-Red Tape Authority (ARTA) launches "E-Reklamo", an online platform where the public can lodge complaints about difficulties in government transactions, including permit application, tax payments, or other fees.
 April 26:
 The Supreme Court in its deliberation denies with finality all motions for reconsideration of its December 7, 2021 decision which challenge the Anti-Terrorism Act of 2020 (Republic Act No. 11479) to declare it as unconstitutional. Due to lack of substantial issues and arguments raised by petitioners, the high court's judgement resulted to reject their motions.
 Global Digital Media associate professor Jonathan Ong has named a 2022 Andrew Carnegie Fellow by Carnegie Corporation of New York.
 April 27:
 The Supreme Court rules that the Bonifacio Global City complex, along with several surrounding barangays of Makati is owned by Taguig. However, the city government of Makati will pursue all legal remedies through an appeal against the said ruling.
 The country's longest bridge connecting Cebu City and Cordova, Cebu, part of the Cebu–Cordova Link Expressway project, is inaugurated.
 President Rodrigo Duterte signs Republic Act No. 11712, that mandating continuous benefits to all healthcare workers in the country during the COVID-19 pandemic and other future public health emergencies.
 President Rodrigo Duterte signs Republic Act No. 11713, that aiming to improve the quality of teachers' education; including a scholarship program for aspiring education students.

May
 May 3 – Pres. Duterte approves the recommendation of the Department of the Interior and Local Government to stop e-sabong or online cockfighting operations. On December 28, Pres. Marcos signs Executive Order No. 9, ordering its continuation.
 May 6:
 Pres. Duterte signs Republic Act (RA) No. 11767 deeming foundlings as natural-born Filipino citizens.
 Pres. Duterte signs RA No. 11768 granting additional qualifications and compensation for Sangguniang Kabataan members.
 The Commission on Human Rights (CHR) releases its report on the world's first National Inquiry on Climate Change (NICC), where it declared climate change as a human rights issue.
 May 9 – National and local elections are held, as mandated by RA No. 7166. On May 5, the government declares the said elections as a special holiday. Former Sen. Bongbong Marcos and Davao City mayor Sara Duterte are elected president and vice president, respectively; twelve senators led by Robin Padilla, and 55 party-lists with ACT-CIS Partylist winning the most seats, are elected in the legislative posts.
 May 12 – The national government orders to adopt digital payments for disbursements and collections of the government through Executive Order No. 170. This is due to being seen as cashless transaction booms in the last two years in Southeast Asia.
 May 18:
 Bro. Armin Luistro FSC, the former education secretary, is named the 28th successor of Saint John Baptist de La Salle, making him the first Filipino to become the Superior General of the De La Salle Brothers worldwide.
 Newspaper columnist and former special envoy for public diplomacy to China Ramon Tulfo is arrested for cyber libel based on the warrant issued by Manila RTC.
 May 21 – Pope Francis approves the promulgation of a decree granting the title of Venerable to the Servant of God Archbishop Teofilo Camomot.
 May 26 – Glenn Banaguas, founder of the Environmental and Climate Change Research Institute (ECCRI) receives the United Nations' Sasakawa Award for his initiatives in disaster risk reduction.
 May 27:
 The Muntinlupa RTC dismisses the contempt case against Sen. Leila de Lima and her legal counsel Filibon Tacardon, over their statements about the testimonies of prosecution witnesses.
 The Supreme Court upholds the 2016 Sandiganbayan verdict convicting NBN-ZTE deal whistleblower Jun Lozada of graft charges. Lozada would surrender to authorities on June 2.
 May 31 – The Court of Appeals upholds the 2018 conviction of retired general Jovito Palparan and two other Army officers in connection to the 2006 abduction and disappearance of two University of the Philippines students, Karen Empeño and Sherlyn Cadapan.

June
 June 2:
 Pharmally Pharmaceutical Corporation officials Mohit Dargani and Linconn Ong, held since 2021 in connection with the company's controversy, are released from the Pasay City Jail after six months in detention.
 Pope Francis names former Manila Archbishop Cardinal Luis Antonio Tagle as one of the new members of the Vatican Congregation for Divine Worship and the Discipline of Sacraments.
 June 3:
 The Supreme Court publicly releases its decision on December 6, 2021, dismissing the appeal of newscaster Mel Tiangco's illegal dismissal and illegal suspension case against ABS-CBN.
 Sandiganbayan convicts businessman Cedric Lee and a former municipal mayor of Mariveles, Bataan for malversation in connection with irregularities in the public market construction project in 2007.
 June 4 – Republic Act No. 11861, which will amend the Solo Parents Welfare Act of 2000 (RA No. 8972) and granting more benefits to single parents, is lapsed into law.
 June 6 – The Quezon City Metropolitan Trial Court acquits 21 residents of Brgy. San Roque arrested during the lockdown in 2020 for protesting out of hunger.
 June 7:
 The Office of the Ombudsman files graft charges before the Sandiganbayan against 42 Bureau of Immigration (BI) personnel who were allegedly involved in the "pastillas scam", or bribery, that allowed the illegal entry of Chinese citizens into the country.
 Sandiganbayan convicts Surigao del Sur Rep. Prospero Pichay Jr. of three counts of graft in connection with mismanagement of funds of Local Water Utilities Administration (LWUA).
 June 8:
 Dr. Gay Jane Perez, the deputy head of the Philippine Space Agency (PhilSA) is elected as president of the International Society for Photogrammetry and Remote Sensing (ISPRS) Technical Commission on Education and Outreach, the first Filipino to hold the position according to the agency.
 The National Telecommunications Commission (NTC) orders internet service providers (ISPs) to block websites allegedly linked to "communist-terrorists" upon request by National Security Adviser Hermogenes Esperon, Jr.
 June 9 – More than 80 individuals, who took part in an activity related to a land dispute in Hacienda Tinang, Concepcion, Tarlac, are arrested. They would be released on June 13; charges against them would be dismissed by a municipal trial court.
 June 14 – The Sandiganbayan stops the graft and malversation trial against former Energy Regulatory Commission (ERC) chairperson Zenaida Ducut due to her dementia diagnosis.
 June 15:
 The Philippines is elected to be the member of the United Nations body that facilitates the implementation of the United Nations Convention on the Law of the Sea (UNCLOS).
 The Anti-Terrorism Council publicly announces its resolutions dated May 25, formally declaring Luis Jalandoni, former chief negotiator of the National Democratic Front of the Philippines, and five other suspected communist rebel leaders, as well as five commanders of the Abu Sayyaf, as terrorists.
 June 17 – The Supreme Court publicly releases its decision on Nov. 16, 2021, that photos and messages gathered by private persons from a social media account are allowed to be presented as evidence in court.
 June 18 – The National Grid Corporation of the Philippines (NGCP) places the Luzon power grid under a red alert status due to insufficient power supply, which briefly affected electricity services to over 1 million customers in Metro Manila and adjacent provinces.
 June 19 – Vice President-elect Sara Duterte is inaugurated as the 15th Vice President of the Philippines.
 June 21 – The government scraps a much touted bus rapid transit (BRT) line in Metro Manila having been overshadowed by slow progress, lack of will as well as the effect of the pandemic.
 June 22 – USS Samuel B. Roberts, a US Navy destroyer sunk during World War II has been found nearly 7,000 meters below sea level off the Philippines, making it the world's deepest shipwreck ever located.
 June 23:
 Pres. Duterte signs Executive Order No. 174, creating new position titles for school teachers.
 Pres. Duterte signs Memorandum Order No. 62, ordering the abolition of state-run First Cavite Industrial Estate,  Inc. (FCIEI), saying it was no longer serving its purpose.
 Pres. Duterte orders the termination of the Philippines' joint oil exploration discussions with China.
 June 25 – The National Shrine of Our Lady of Peace and Good Voyage in Antipolo is declared by the Vatican as the first international shrine in the Philippines.
 June 28:
 The Securities and Exchange Commission affirms its previous order to revoke the certificates of incorporation of Rappler Inc. and Rappler Holdings Corporation. The order shuts down the latter as being one of the news agencies deemed critical of the outgoing President Rodrigo Duterte. Maria Ressa, the co-founder of the online news organization in 2012 said "We're not shutting down", in a statement.
 The Supreme Court unanimously junks cases of disqualification and cancellation of certificate of candidacy against president-elect Bongbong Marcos.
 June 30:
 The Supreme Court publicly releases its decision on March 9, affirming the Office of the Ombudsman's decision to subpoena the bank accounts of former Pres. Joseph Estrada and his alleged mistresses.
 Ferdinand (Bongbong) R. Marcos Jr. is inaugurated as the 17th President of the Philippines, marking the beginning of his administration.
 Pres. Bongbong Marcos signs Executive Order No. 1, ordering the abolition of the Office of the Cabinet Secretary and the Presidential Anti-Corruption Commission (PACC), citing the need for a "just allocation of resources" amid the ongoing health and fiscal crises.
 Pres. Bongbong Marcos signs Executive Order No. 2, ordering the reorganization and renaming of the Presidential Communications Operations Office (PCOO) into the Office of the Press Secretary (OPS).

July
 July 1 – The Apo Reef Natural Park in Occidental Mindoro receives the platinum-level Blue Park Award from the Marine Conservation International at this year's United Nations Ocean Conference in Lisbon, Portugal; the second such recognition after Tubbataha Reefs Natural Park in Palawan in 2017.
 July 2 – The National Bureau of Investigation (NBI) confirms it had filed murder complaints against 22 police officers of the National Capital Region Police Office (NCRPO) for the deaths of eight New Bilibid Prison inmates who supposedly died of COVID-19.
 July 5 – The Sandiganbayan finds retired Major General Carlos Garcia guilty beyond reasonable doubt of direct bribery and facilitating money laundering, sentencing him to four years to eight years of imprisonment.
 July 7 – Three European Union (EU) countries warn their consumers over Lucky Me! noodle soup and pancit canton variants, due to supposed high levels of ethylene oxide, a gas commonly used as pesticide.
 July 8 – The Court of Appeals (CA) affirms the cyber libel conviction of Rappler CEO and Nobel Peace Prize winner Maria Ressa and her former writer-researcher Reynaldo Santos Jr. by a Manila court in connection with an article published in May 2012, that linking businessman Wildredo Keng to alleged illegal activities.
 July 13 – Pope Francis appoints Cardinal Jose Advincula of Manila as a new member of the Vatican's Dicastery for Bishops, which helps the pope pick the next bishops for the dioceses.
 July 19 – The Sandiganbayan has affirms the conviction of former Philippine National Police (PNP) chief Jesus Verzosa and five other retired police officers for their graft case. 
 July 22 – The Sandiganbayan has affirms its earlier decision to junk the forfeiture case filed against the Marcoses on the family's alleged ill-gotten wealth.
 July 23 – A bill lapses into law as Republic Act (RA) No. 11898, amending Ecological Solid Waste Management Act and requiring large companies to recover their plastic packaging waste to address plastic pollution in the country.
 July 24 – A mass shooting inside the Ateneo de Manila University (ADMU) campus in Quezon City kills three people and injures two others.
 July 25:
 The 19th Congress of the Philippines, which consisted of the super majority coalition, starts to convene as Pres. Marcos delivers his first State of the Nation Address.
 The controversial Vaporized Nicotine and Non-Nicotine Products Regulation Act of 2022 is lapsed into law as advocates push for vape use as alternative for cigarettes.
 July 26 – The Vatican has formally designated the Archdiocesan Shrine of St. Anne in Taguig City as a minor basilica, one of the 20 churches in the country to have received such honor.
 July 27:
 A 7.0-magnitude earthquake hit large parts of Luzon; eleven are killed, damages are recorded at around two billion pesos.
 Executive Secretary Vic Rodriguez signs Memorandum Circular No. 3, extending the authority of people who serve as officers-in-charge of their respective government agencies until December 31, unless their replacement has already been designated.
 The University of the Philippines launches the country's first doctoral program in artificial intelligence.
 July 28:
 The Supreme Court publicly releases its decision on March 16, acquitting actor and former Optical Media Board chair Ronnie Ricketts of graft over a questionable raid of pirated digital video discs (DVDs) and video compact discs (VCDs) in Quiapo, Manila in May 2010.
 A bill lapses into law as RA No. 11908, establishing the Parent Effectiveness Service program in the country which aims to aid parents and substitutes involved in child development.
 A bill lapses into law as RA No. 11909, making birth, death and marriage certificates permanently valid.
 July 29 – The country's first case of monkeypox is recorded; only four are reported by year-end.
 July 30:
 A bill lapses into law as RA No. 11913, declaring August 12 of every year as the National Youth Day.
 A bill lapses into law as RA No. 11917, repealing RA No. 5487, strengthening the regulation of the country's private security services industry.
 A bill lapses into law as RA No. 11929, aiming to establish a separate, Alcatraz-like facility for prisoners convicted of heinous crimes.
 A bill lapses into law as RA No. 11930, amending the Anti-Pornography Act (RA No. 9775) and requiring internet intermediaries to act against online sexual exploitation of minors.
 July 31 – The Court of Appeals (CA), publicly releasing its July 21 decision, orders the filing of rape and acts of lasciviousness charges against actor Vhong Navarro as it overturns the Department of Justice's dismissal of complaints filed by model Deniece Cornejo, related to the incidents in 2014 wherein Cornejo claimed that she was raped by Navarro. On September 19, Navarro surrenders to the National Bureau of Investigation following a warrant of arrest issued against him by a Taguig Metropolitan Trial Court. CA later denies Navarro's motion for reconsideration of its decision. On December 5, the Taguig Regional Trial Court grants Navarro's petition to post bail in connection with the case.

August
 August 8 – Former vice presidential candidate Walden Bello is arrested by members of the Quezon City Police District (QCPD) over cyber libel charges filed against him by former Davao City information officer Jefry Tupas.
 August 9:
 The Office of the Ombudsman publicly releases its decision on January 5, 2022, that dismissing the bribery complaints against former senator Leila de Lima and her former bodyguard Ronnie Dayan, over an alleged ₱8 million bribe from self-confessed drug lord Kerwin Espinosa.
 Angelo Karlo Guillen, a Filipino human rights lawyer who survived an assassination attempt in March 2021, wins the 2022 Roger N. Baldwin Medal of Liberty.
 After 10 months in orbit, the country's first local university-built Filipino cube satellites (CubeSats) Maya-3 and Maya-4 re-entered the Earth's atmosphere on August 4 and 8 respectively, ending their mission.
 August 10 – The University of the Philippines Visayas Tacloban College (UPVTC), announces the first sighting of Philippine tarsier in Tacloban City.
 August 11 – The Quezon City Regional Trial Court (RTC) Branch 306 grants the petition of the alternative news site Bulatlat to temporarily unblock its website.
 August 15:
 The Department of Justice (DOJ) charges at least 16 people, including nuns, linked with the Rural Missionaries of the Philippines (RMP) for the non-bailable offense of allegedly providing funds to the Communist Party of the Philippines–New People's Army (CPP–NPA).
 The Colegio de San Lorenzo in Quezon City announces that it would be closing down and will cease operations by September 2022, due to financial instability as a result of the COVID-19 pandemic, and low enrollment.
 August 16:
 Department of Budget and Management (DBM) Secretary Amenah Pangandaman approves the Special Allotment Release Order (SARO) and the Notice of Cash Allocation (NCA) amounting to ₱1.4 billion, which will cover the additional funds needed for the extended "Libreng Sakay" program.
 The United Nations announces the appointment of 10 members of a leadership panel that will support the UN's Internet Governance Forum (IGF), an annual discussion about public policy issues concerning the internet, among the appointed members of the panel is Rappler CEO and Nobel Peace Prize laureate Maria Ressa.
 The World Stroke Organization (WSO) awards several hospitals in the Philippines for having exemplary performance in providing quality medical services.
 August 18 – The Japan International Cooperation Agency (JICA) launches a digital math textbook written in the Visayan language, in a bid to improve how the subject is taught in the country.
 August 21 – Human rights lawyer Chel Diokno is elected as the new chairperson of the Bantayog ng mga Bayani Foundation, a group that advocates freedom, justice and democracy, and gives honor to the heroes of the martial law years.
 August 22:
 Majority of the schools nationwide hold in-person classes for 27.6-million students as part of transition to such system, which will be fully implemented, mandatory in public schools, on November 2.
 A motorboat carrying suspected members of the Communist Party of the Philippines and the New People's Army explodes off the coast of Catbalogan, Samar, during an encounter with the military. Eight bodies are retrieved days later. In December, the National Intelligence Coordinating Agency confirms that the couple and communist leaders, Benito and Wilma Tiamzon, are among those killed.
 August 23 – The Philippine government declares war against online child sexual exploitation following such reports during the ongoing pandemic.
 August 25 – Adora Faye de Vera, a Martial Law survivor and sister of Commission on Higher Education (CHED) chairperson Prospero de Vera III was arrested by the police for alleged murder charges.
 August 29 – The Commission on Higher Education announces that they removing the vaccination requirements for students and teachers who were joining the implementation of face-to-face classes.
 August 30 – The Supreme Court issues a temporary restraining order (TRO) which halts, for the time being, the implementation of the "no-contact apprehension program" (NCAP) of some Metro Manila cities.
 August 31:
 Bernadette J. Madrid, a Filipina doctor and children's rights champion is among the 4 recipients of this year's Ramon Magsaysay Award, considered Asia's Nobel Prize.
 Pope Francis appoints Fr. Jose V.C. Quilongquilong as consultor of the Congregation for Catholic Education that oversees Catholic schools, universities, and institutes of higher education around the world.

September
 September 3 – Calaca in Batangas becomes a city after a plebiscite which ratified the conversion in accordance with Republic Act No. 11554.
 September 5:
 The Court of Appeals voids the arrest warrants issued against detained activist Reina Mae Nasino, the mother who lost her three-month-old daughter while in detention in 2020, and two other activists that were the basis of their arrest in Manila in November 2019.
 Gwyneth Anne Chua, a Filipina traveler who skipped mandatory quarantine protocols in December 2021, pleads guilty for violating Republic Act No. 11332, that requiring mandatory reporting of notifiable diseases and will be fined ₱20,000.
 September 6 – The Department of Justice publicly releases its decision on May 12, 2022, that dismissing for lack of merit the cyber libel charges against Gabriela Women's Party-List Rep. Arlene Brosas and former Makabayan bloc House representatives Carlos Isagani Zarate, Luzviminda Calolot-Ilagan and Liza Maza over alleged defamatory and libelous statements against the police in 2021.
 September 8 – The Senate Blue Ribbon Committee recommends the filing of administrative and criminal charges against suspended Agriculture Undersecretary Leocadio Sebastian and three former Sugar Regulatory Administration officials over the controversial Sugar Order No. 4.
 September 10 – The Supreme Court publicly releases its decision on June 28, 2022, that those who are unknown or unpopular should not be automatically declared as nuisance candidates.
 September 12:
 Pres. Marcos signs Executive Order No. 3, allowing the voluntary use of face mask in outdoor settings.
 The National Grid Corporation of the Philippines places the Luzon Grid under Red Alert status, after the forced outage of at least seven power plants.
 Pres. Marcos signs Proclamation No. 57, extending (for the last time) the nationwide state of calamity due to COVID-19 pandemic until December 31, when the status lapses.
 September 13 – Pres. Marcos approves a one-year moratorium on the amortization of agrarian reform beneficiaries, fulfilling his promise to ease the debt burden of farmers, the agrarian reform department said.
 September 15 – The Supreme Court publicly releases its decision on July 4, 2022, that dissolved a writ of preliminary injunction seeking to stop then Department of Transportation and Communications from holding a bidding for driver's license cards.
 September 16:
 The Land Transportation Franchising and Regulatory Board approves a ₱1 fare increase for traditional and modern jeepneys, pushing the minimum fare to ₱12 and ₱14 respectively.
 The Philippine government and German development agency Deutsche Gesellschaft für Internationale Zusammenarbeit signs a deal for a €5-million technical assistance grant to make climate information accessible to the public.
 Pres. Marcos signs Executive Order No. 5, that directed the transfer of the Technical Education and Skills Development Authority from the Department of Trade and Industry to the Department of Labor and Employment.
 September 17 – In accordance with Republic Act No. 11550, Maguindanao is divided into new provinces of Maguindanao del Norte and Maguindanao del Sur through what will be the most participated province-wide plebiscite by COMELEC.
 September 21 – The Manila Regional Trial Court dismisses the Philippine government's petition to declare the Communist Party of the Philippines and the New People's Army as terrorist organizations, citing that rebellion is not an act of terrorism and these groups were not organized to be engaged in the latter.
 September 25–26 – Super Typhoon Noru (Karding) devastates Luzon. Damages are estimated at more than three billion pesos; 12 are reportedly dead and six are missing.
 September 27 – The Masungi Geopark Project bagged the highest honor for the Inspire Category in the United Nations Sustainable Development Goals Action Awards which was held in Bonn, Germany.
 September 28 – The final phase of decommissioning of The Moro Islamic Liberation Front's fighters begins.
 September 30:
 The Supreme Court publicly releases its decision on December 7, 2021, that struck down two subsections of the Bayanihan 2 Law which imposed new taxes on Philippine Offshore Gaming Operators licensees.
 The Liberal Party elects veteran lawmaker Edcel Lagman as its new president, replacing former Senator Francis Pangilinan, who was named party chairman.

October
 October 1 – In a rare moment, 433 bettors win the jackpot prize, worth more than ₱200-million, of the Grand Lotto 6/55.
 October 3 – Broadcaster Percy Lapid was killed en route to his home in Las Piñas. The killing received domestic and international condemnation. In November, two separate murder complaints will be filed by the National Bureau of Investigation and the Philippine National Police before the Department of Justice against suspended Bureau of Corrections chief Gerald Bantag and Senior Superintendent Ricardo Zulueta, tagged as masterminds in the killing of Lapid as well as the alleged middleman Jun Villamor.
 October 9 – Three alleged members of Abu Sayyaf Group detained at the Philippine National Police Custodial Center, Camp Crame, Quezon City are killed in their failed attempt to escape, with one of them has held hostage co-detainee, former Sen. Leila de Lima.
 October 10:
 A law (Republic Act No. 11934) requiring the registration of SIM cards becomes the first to be signed under the administration of Pres. Marcos. The same measure has vetoed by his predecessor on April 15.
 A law (Republic Act No. 11935) postponing the December 5 Barangay and Sangguniang Kabataan elections and setting both synchronized elections on the last Monday of October, beginning in 2023, and every three years thereafter ​is also signed by Pres. Marcos. This will be made public two days later.
 The Sandiganbayan sentences former mayor Datu Sajid Islam Ampatuan of Shariff Saydona Mustapha, Maguindanao to at least 128 years in prison for multiple counts of graft and malversation.
 October 11 – Juanito Jose Diaz Remulla III, the son of Justice Secretary Boying Remulla is arrested by members of the Philippine Drug Enforcement Agency in connection with a parcel allegedly containing ₱1.3 million worth of "kush" or high-grade marijuana.
 October 17 — Veteran election lawyer Romulo "Romy" Macalintal files a petition before the Supreme Court challenging the constitutionality of Republic Act No. 11935 which postpones the barangay elections to 2023.
 October 19 – Bonuan Buquig National High School in Dagupan wins the World's Best School Prize for Environmental Action after it restored lost mangroves to reverse the devastation caused by typhoon Pepeng in 2009.
 October 20 – The Sandiganbayan publicly releases its decision on October 14, 2022, that dismissing the graft and falsification charges against former Caloocan mayor Recom Echiverri and two other former city officials due to lack of evidence.
 October 23 – Korean Air Flight 631 suffers a runway excursion upon landing at Mactan–Cebu International Airport with no injuries reported.
 October 30 – Severe Tropical Storm Nalgae (Paeng) devastates the country. Hardest-hit regions are Calabarzon, Bicol Region, Western Visayas and the Bangsamoro Autonomous Region in Muslim Mindanao, the latter wherein most casualties were reported. Damages are estimated at almost twelve billion pesos; 160 are reportedly dead and 30 are missing.

November
 November 3 – Australian sex offender Peter Scully is convicted by the Misamis Oriental Regional Trial Court in relation to 60 cases of human trafficking and child abuse, the last batch of those filed against him, in Cagayan de Oro, and is given a 129-year prison sentence. His Filipina girlfriend is sentenced to 126 years of imprisonment. It is the second conviction for Scully, who had been given prison sentences in 2018 for the same offenses.
 November 7 – The Philippines lifts a ban on the deployment of workers, including maids and construction workers to Saudi Arabia, after steps were taken to reduce frequent abuses.
 November 8:
 The Philippines receives its ₱6.84-billion Ground Based Air Defense System, and a new medium-lift transport aircraft for the Philippine Air Force.
 Clashes erupt between the Philippine Army and the Moro Islamic Liberation Front in Ungkaya Pukan, Basilan with the former conducting clearing operations against "lawless elements" in the area controlled by the latter threatening the Bangsamoro peace process. Fighting continued until November 10 when a ceasefire was signed between two sides.
 November 10 – The Caloocan Regional Trial Court convicts Police Officer 1 Jefrey Perez for the torture and planting of evidence on Carl Angelo Arnaiz and Reynaldo de Guzman, killed during the country's drug war in August 2017.
 November 25 – The Sandiganbayan founds former Quezon City councilor and actor Roderick Paulate guilty of graft and falsification charges and sentenced him to at least 10 years minimum jail time in connection with the hiring of fictitious job contractors in 2010.

December
 December 5 – After two years of closure, the Light Rail Manila Corporation (LRMC) reopens the Roosevelt Station of the Light Rail Transit Line 1 (LRT1) with adjusted train service hours.
 December 7 – Republic Act No. 11596, a law signed in 2021 banning child marriage in the country, is officially implemented.
 December 9
 The United States Department of the Treasury imposes sanctions on KOJC pastor Apollo Quiboloy and around 40 others across 9 countries for alleged involvement in corruption and human rights abuses.
 An ambush followed by an encounter between members of the Citizen Armed Force Geographical Unit and some 50 lawless elements in Aleosan, Cotabato resulted in the deaths of six militiamen and three gunmen.
 December 17 – Baliwag in Bulacan becomes a city as the conversion is ratified in a plebiscite in accordance with Republic Act No. 11929, which has lapsed into law on July 30.
 December 18 – Flooding begins in Mimaropa and Bicol regions, Visayas and major parts of Mindanao due to the heavy rains brought by a weather system, shear line. Damages are estimated at ₱1.46-billion; 52 deaths and 18 missing persons have been reported (as of Jan. 4, 2023).
 December 27 – Mandatory registration of SIM card starts after its implementing rules and regulations have been released by National Telecommunications Commission.

Holidays

On October 29, 2021, through Proclamation No. 1236, the national government declares holidays and special (working/non-working) days to be observed in the country. Note that in the list, holidays in bold are "regular holidays," and those in italics are "special (non-working) holidays."

 January 1 – New Year's Day
 February 1 – Chinese New Year
 February 25 – EDSA People Power Revolution Anniversary
 April 9 – Araw ng Kagitingan (Day of Valor)
 April 14 – Maundy Thursday
 April 15 – Good Friday
 April 16 – Black Saturday
 May 1 – Labor Day
 May 3 – Eid'l Fitr (Feast of Ramadan)
 May 9 – Election Day
 June 12 – Independence Day
 July 9 – Eid'l Adha (Feast of Sacrifice)
 August 21 – Ninoy Aquino Day
 August 29 – National Heroes Day
 October 31 – Special non-working holiday
 November 1 – All Saints Day
 November 30 – Bonifacio Day
 December 8 – Feast of the Immaculate Conception
 December 25 – Christmas Day
 December 26 – Special non-working holiday
 December 30 – Rizal Day

Meanwhile, previously special non-working holidays, All Souls' Day (November 2), Christmas Eve (December 24) and the last day of the year (December 31), had been declared as "special (working) days" since 2021, in an effort for economic recovery during the COVID-19 pandemic.

In addition, several other places observe local holidays, such as the foundation of their town. These are also "special days."

Business and economy

January
 January 4 – Japan–Philippines relations: The Philippines and Japan renews the Bilateral Swap Arrangement, granting currency exchange between the Philippine peso and the Japanese yen.
 January 5 – Bangko Sentral ng Pilipinas Governor Benjamin Diokno is named the Global Central Banker of the Year 2022, by the international banking magazine The Banker.
 January 18 – The Department of Transportation signs a contract worth ₱142 billion with a joint venture involving China Railway Group Limited for the first phase of the extension of the Philippine National Railways system to the Bicol Region.
 January 25 – The National Telecommunications Commission gives both the analog and digital broadcast frequencies which was previously held by ABS-CBN Corporation to Advanced Media Broadcasting System, Sonshine Media Network International and Aliw Broadcasting Corporation.
 January 31 – The Philippine Stock Exchange halts the trading shares of Dito CME Holdings Corporation after the company announces that it was canceling its stock rights offer.

February
 February 3 – London firm OneWeb with Philippine Space Agency (PhilSA) test connectivity services in rural areas in the country.
 February 4 – The Bankers Association of the Philippines and the Department of Justice signs an accord to work together in raising cybersecurity awareness and curbing cybercrimes in the country.
 February 9 – The Japan International Cooperation Agency extends a ¥329-million grant to the Philippines aimed at further developing human resources in the country.

March
 March 31 – Space Exploration Technologies Corp. to launch Starlink satellite broadband service in the Philippines, a first in Southeast Asia. The service is expected to be available in the fourth quarter of the year 2022.

April
 April 1 – The Fiscal Incentive Review Board of the Department of Finance orders IT-BPO companies to return to work onsite through its Resolution No. 19-21. The board's resolution allows work-from-home (WFH) arrangements for 90% of their workforce until March 31, 2022. But the latter push to extend the arrangement until September 12, 2022 but the former denies the extension requests.
 April 6 – Bangko Sentral ng Pilipinas launches the new ₱1,000 polymer banknote featuring the Philippine eagle in place of three World War 2 heroes, despite earlier criticisms from historians.
 April 25 – Sun Cellular postpaid service is rebranded as Smart postpaid product of Smart Communications. The move resulted to officially defunct the former.
 April 28 – The Bangko Sentral ng Pilipinas approves sanctions against BDO Unibank and UnionBank of the Philippines over the hacking incident that affected depositors in December 2021.

May
 May 27 – The National Telecommunications Commission approves the registration of Starlink Internet Services Philippines Inc., a subsidiary of SpaceX with headquarters in California, USA. Starlink Philippines will operate as a Value-added service provider.

June
 June 6 – Hostile takeover of Okada Manila that involved kidnapping.

July
 July 22 – Banco de Oro Universal Bank, the country's largest private financial institution, moved to foreclose on the loan collateral of Dennis Uy of Davao, firing the opening salvo in a series of moves that depending on the ability of the controversial businessman to settle his obligations in four days that could lead to the largest corporate default in Philippine history.
 July 29 – The Makati City Prosecutor's Office junks the falsification raps against gaming tycoon Kazuo Okada filed by a rival faction of his company, Tiger Resort Leisure & Entertainment, Inc. (TRLEI), which operates casino-hotel Okada Manila.

August
 August 10:
 The Securities and Exchange Commission revokes the registration of Katuwang Poultry Chicken Egg Producing Corporation for illegally soliciting investments from the public online.
 President Bongbong Marcos rejects the Sugar Order No. 4 draft, a proposal to import an additional 300,000 metric tons of sugar, amidst a sugar crisis. This led to the resignation of Sugar Regulatory Administration officials and an investigation was launched on the document by both the House of Representatives and the Senate.
 A joint agreement between ABS-CBN Corporation and MediaQuest Holdings is officially signed. The said joint agreement lasted for a month.
 August 26 – Department of Trade and Industry (DTI) and the International Labour Organization (ILO) signs a Japan-supported memorandum of understanding that was part of the $2.2 million Japan-ILO project called Bringing Back Jobs Safely under the COVID-19 Crisis in the Philippines: Rebooting Small and Informal Businesses Safely and Digitally.

September
 September 2 – The Philippine Amusement and Gaming Corporation (PAGCOR) orders the group of businessman Antonio "Tonyboy" Cojuangco to cease and desist from running Okada Manila.
 September 5 – Digital payments platform Visa announces the appointment of Jeff Navarro as the new manager for the Philippines and Guam, following his stint in Western Union.
 September 9 – Ayala Corporation president, CEO and vice chairman of the board Fernando Zobel de Ayala, who is currently on medical leave, resigns to his positions to focus on his health and recovery.

October
 October 17 – Japanese gaming tycoon Kazuo Okada is arrested by authorities upon his arrival in Manila, for grave coercion cases filed by former business partners and executives.

Entertainment and culture

January
 January 26 – Miss Philippines Nica Zosa is crowned Miss Summit International 2022, which was held in Las Vegas, Nevada, USA.
 January 28 – The Filipino traditional dish sinigang is named as the Best Soup in the world, according to the TasteAtlas.
 January 29 – Two Filipino films, Don Josephus Eblahan's The Headhunter's Daughter and Martika Ramirez Escobar's Leonor Will Never Die, win prestigious prizes at the Sundance Film Festival 2022 awards ceremony.

March
 March 6 – Fuchsia Anne Ravena of Cebu City is crowned as Miss International Queen Philippines 2022 during the coronation night held at the SMX Convention Center in Pasay City.
 March 17 – Miss Philippines Tracy Perez finishes in the Top 13 at Miss World 2021 held in San Juan, Puerto Rico.
 March 18 – Miss Philippines Kathleen Paton is crowned Miss Eco International 2022, which was held in Egypt.
 March 27 – Dean Dianne Balogal of Baguio is crowned as Hiyas ng Pilipinas 2022 during the coronation night held at Cebu Province.
 March 30:
 Miss Universe 2018 Catriona Gray unveiles a wax figure of herself at Madame Tussauds Singapore, making her the first Filipino with a replica of herself in the museum.
 Miss Philippines Jerelleen Rodriguez is crowned Reina Internacional del Cacao 2022, which was held in Panama.

April
 April 3 – Miss Philippines Michelle Arceo wins the title of 1st runner-up in the Miss Environment International 2022 pageant which was held in Mumbai, India.
 April 12 – Filipino director Brillante Mendoza received a lifetime achievement award, Filipino actors Christian Bables and Vince Rillon wins best actor award, while Erik Matti's On the Job: The Missing 8 bags the award for Best Film, at the 19th Asian Film Festival which held in Rome, Italy.
 April 19 – Zeah Nestle Pala of Tarlac is crowned as Miss Bikini Philippines 2021 during the coronation night held at the Vista Alabang in Las Piñas City.
 April 25 – Filipino novelist Gina Apostol has been selected as one of four fellows in literature of the prestigious Rome Prize.
 April 28 – The film Uncharted starring Tom Holland and Mark Wahlberg, produced by Sony Pictures is pulled out from cinemas due to a scene showing China's nine-dash map illustrating their disputed claim over the South China Sea.
 April 30 – Celeste Cortesi of Pasay is crowned Miss Universe Philippines in its 2022 pageant's coronation event.

May
 May 1 – Kriz Gazmen is named as the new head of ABS-CBN Films, replacing Olivia Lamasan who now serves as the consultant for content, partnerships, and talent management via Rise Artists Studio of the same company.
 May 24 – Filmmaker Ramona Diaz's A Thousand Cuts, the 2021 FRONTLINE documentary probing the war between the government and the press in the Philippines, wins the 2022 Robert F. Kennedy Journalism Award in the International TV category.
 May 28 – Triangle of Sadness and Plan 75, two films featuring Overseas Filipino Workers (OFWs) wins top prizes at the 2022 Cannes Film Festival in France.
 May 29 – Singer Anji Salvacion from the Celebrity Edition was proclaimed as the winner of Pinoy Big Brother: Kumunity Season 10.

June
 June 5 – Gwendolyne Fourniol of Negros Occidental is crowned Miss World Philippines in its 2022 pageant's coronation event.
 June 7 – The Cinemalaya Philippine Independent Film Festival announces the top 13 finalists for its 2022 full-length film competition.
 June 8 – Filmmaker Ramona Diaz's A Thousand Cuts, the 2021 FRONTLINE documentary probing the war between the government and the press in the Philippines, wins the 2022 George Foster Peabody Award in the Documentary category.
 June 10 – President Rodrigo Duterte declares Nora Aunor, Salvacion Lim-Higgins, Agnes Locsin, Fides Cuyugan-Asensio, Ricky Lee, Gémino Abad, Tony Mabesa and Marilou Diaz-Abaya, the eight icons of Filipino arts and culture as National Artist of the Philippines for 2022.
 June 11:
 Miss Philippines Shanon Tampon wins the title of 1st runner-up in the Miss Elite 2022 pageant which was held in Egypt.
 Miss Philippines Shane Tormes is crowned Miss Global 2022, which was held in Indonesia.
 June 18 – The coronation event of the Man of the World 2022 pageant takes place in Baguio. This is the first time that the Philippines hosted the event. Aditya Khurana of India was crowned as Man of the World 2022.
 June 19 – Basurero, a short film featuring actor Jericho Rosales, wins the Grand Jury Best Global Film award at the Auntyland Film Festival 2022 awards ceremony.
 June 25:
 Micca Rosal of Batangas is crowned as Miss Aura International Philippines 2022 during the coronation night held at the St. Francis Shangri-la Place in Mandaluyong City.
 Miss Philippines Fuchsia Anne Ravena is crowned Miss International Queen 2022, which was held in Pattaya, Thailand.
 June 27 – Myron Jude Ordillano of Parañaque City is crowned as Mister International Philippines 2022 during the coronation night held at the grand ballroom of Okada Manila in Parañaque City.
 June 29 – The Philippines' Jollibee has been hailed as the "best fried chicken chain in America" by United States-based food website Eater.

July
 July 6 – The Filipino Christmas staple bibingka is included in the top 15 best-rated cakes in the world, according to the TasteAtlas.
 July 7 – Five restaurants establishments from the Philippines have been included in the Top Restaurants in Asia 2022 list of Opinionated About Dining (OAD), a global ranking system.
 July 13 – Boracay is included to the list of "World's 50 Greatest Places in 2022" by TIME Magazine.
 July 16:
 Top destinations Boracay, Palawan, and Cebu were made the list of "25 Best Islands in the World" that put together by New York-based magazine Travel + Leisure.
 Miss Philippines Alison Black finishes in the Top 24 at Miss Supranational 2022 held in Nowy Sącz, Poland.
 Filipino students took home 2 bronze medals at the 63rd International Mathematical Olympiad (IMO) which was held in Oslo, Norway.
 July 17 – Mister Philippines RaÉd Fernandez Al-Zghayér finishes in the Top 20 at Mister Supranational 2022 held in Nowy Sącz, Poland.
 July 19 – Kathleen Paton returns in Egypt, where she was crowned Miss Eco International to receive her diplomatic title as United Nations (UN) youth goodwill ambassador.
 July 22 – Philippine delegates Angela Clare Lim Tan, Alexis Griff Genovatin and Arthur Caleb Co wins gold medals and a silver at the 2022 Copernicus Math Olympiad which was held in New York City.
 July 23 – Sam Coloso of Parañaque City is crowned as first Showtime Sexy Babe grand winner of It's Showtime.
 July 28 – The Cultural Center of the Philippines (CCP) announces the winners of its inaugural content creation grants program.
 July 30 – ABS-CBN actress and executive Charo Santos-Concio and musical film Katips wins top awards in the 70th FAMAS Awards which was held at the Metropolitan Theatre in Manila.
 July 31 – Nicole Borromeo of Cebu is crowned Binibining Pilipinas–International in its 2022 pageant's coronation event.

August
 August 6 – Jenny Ramp of Tarlac is crowned Miss Philippines Earth in its 2022 pageant's coronation event.
 August 7 – Miss Philippines Joanna Camelle Mercado is crowned Miss United Continents 2022, which was held in Portoviejo, Ecuador.
 August 8:
 Airbnb releases a list of its 12 best hosts under the age of 30 in the Asia Pacific region, and it includes Dwyane Yra Dinglasan and Deo Dia.
 The Filipino dish Tortang talong is included in the best egg dish in the world, according to the TasteAtlas.
 August 10 – Three restaurants in the Philippines has been recognized by an Italy-based online guidebook as among the best pizza places in the Asia-Pacific region.
 August 12:
 The famous Dancing Inmates of the Cebu Provincial Detention and Rehabilitation Center were relaunched by the provincial government of Cebu.
 FPJ's Ang Probinsyano, the country's longest-running television series which premiered in 2015, ends as announced by actor Coco Martin on its July 22 episode.
 The first drop for the non-fungible token collection of Idol Philippines takes place as part of a promotion. The singing television competition becomes the first-ever Philippine television program to launch its own NFT collection.
 August 14 – The Baseball Player and Blue Room, wins top prizes at the Cinemalaya Philippine Independent Film Festival 2022.
 August 18 – Four paintings by Fernando Amorsolo, the first National Artist of the Philippines, has been donated to the National Museum of the Philippines.
 August 19 – The Filipino dish Kare-kare is included in the 100 best-rated stews in the world, according to the TasteAtlas.
 August 20 – Kapuso Mo, Jessica Soho wins the Top Media Publisher Award at the TikTok Awards Philippines 2022.
 August 26 – The Broken Marriage Vow, the ABS-CBN's adaptation of BBC One's hit global drama "Doctor Foster", wins the Best TV Format Adaptation (Scripted) in Asia category at the ContentAsia Awards in Bangkok, Thailand.
 August 29 – Vogue Philippines releases its first issue features Chloe Magno, a Filipino-American model hailing from Davao.

September
 September 5 – ABS-CBN actress Belle Mariano is named as one of the recipients of the Outstanding Asian Star Prize at the 2022 Seoul International Drama Awards. On September 22, Mariano finally receives her Outstanding Asian Star award at Seoul International Drama Awards in South Korea.
 September 8:
 The Mutya ng Pilipinas organization adjusts the age requirement for candidates of this year's national pageant.
 The Philippines scores a back-to-back win at the 29th World Travel Awards as Asia's Leading Beach Destination and Asia's Leading Dive Destination.
 September 13 – ABS-CBN's "Kapamilya Himig Handog" songwriting contest and "Act As If You Have the Virus" internal communications campaign wins the big prize at the prestigious 2022 Silver Quill Awards given by the International Association of Business Communicators (IABC) Asia Pacific.
 September 18 – Khimo Gumatay of Makati City won as the second Idol Philippines grand champion.
 September 20:
 The Museo ng Pag-asa of the Angat Buhay Foundation is opened to the public.
 Filipino-South African poet Jim Pascual Agustin is awarded the 2022 Gaudy Boy Poetry Book Prize by New York-based press Singapore Unbound for his work "Waking Up to the pattern Left by a Snail Overnight".
 September 25:
 The Museo Pambata is re-opened to the public.
 Lea Salonga is named as one of the recipients of Time magazine's TIME100 Impact Awards for the year 2022.
 Miss Philippines Micca Rosal finishes in the Top 10 at Miss Aura International 2022 held in Turkey.
 September 27 – The Philippine International Convention Center (PICC) is declared a national cultural treasure.
 September 28 – The Filipino dish Lumpiang Shanghai is included in the Top 50 best street snacks around the globe, according to the TasteAtlas.
 September 29:
 ABS-CBN News chief Regina "Ging" Reyes is named the 2022 Southeast Asia Laureate for Women in News Editorial Leadership by the World Association of News Publishers for her exceptional contribution to the newsroom, editorial integrity, and outstanding leadership.
 GMA News and Public Affairs' "Dapat Totoo" campaign wins the Best in Audience Engagement award at the Digital Media Awards Worldwide organized by the World Association of News Publishers.
 A Thousand Cuts, the documentary following Rappler CEO Maria Ressa, wins the award for Outstanding Social Issue Documentary at the News and Documentary Emmys.
 September 30 – 16 ABS-CBN shows and personalities were dominated as the national winners of the Asian Academy Creative Awards.

October
 October 1 – Mister Philippines Joshua De Sequera wins the title of 1st runner-up in the Manhunt International 2022 pageant which was held in Manila.
 October 3 – Filipino-American beauty queen R'Bonney Gabriel of Texas is crowned Miss USA 2022, which was held in Reno, Nevada.
 October 4 – Shangri-La Boracay and El Nido Resorts, the two resorts in the Philippines have been voted among the best in the world in Conde Nast Traveler's Readers' Choice Awards for 2022.
 October 7 – The Tumindig artwork, created by Kevin Eric Raymundo, better known as "Tarantadong Kalbo", is among the nine Filipino projects who were recognized at the Good Design Awards 2022.
 October 12 – Precious Paula Nicole was hailed as the first winner of Drag Race Philippines at the conclusion of the competition series which was held at the Okada Manila.
 October 14:
 The Philippines’ Chicken inasal ranks 5th out of 50 in Taste Atlas’ latest list of best chicken dishes in the world.
 Miss Philippines Gabrielle Basiano finishes in the Top 20 at Miss Intercontinental 2022 held in Egypt.
 October 15:
 Miss Philippines Chelsea Fernandez finishes in the Top 15 at Miss Globe 2022 held in Tirana, Albania.
 Miss Philippines Alexandra Mae Rosales is crowned Miss Supermodel Worldwide 2022, which was held in India.
 October 19 – Beauty queen-actress Pia Wurtzbach was the highest earning Instagram user from the Philippines in 2021, according to NetCredit.
 October 21:
 Anne Patricia Lorenzo of Tondo, Manila, is hailed as the grand winner of Miss Q&A: Kween of the Multibeks of It's Showtime.
 Kathryn Bernardo and Daniel Padilla were emerged as ultimate fan favorites in the inaugural Jeepney TV Fan Favorite Awards.
 October 25 – Miss Philippines Roberta Tamondong finishes in the Top 20 at Miss Grand International 2022 in Bali and Jakarta, Indonesia. She was later appointed by the organization as the 5th runner-up on October 30, following of the resignation of Yuvna Rinishta of Mauritius, three days after the coronation night.
 October 30:
 Mister Philippines MJ Ordillano wins the title of 4th runner-up in the Mister International 2022 pageant which was held in Quezon City.
 Kevin Lao and Berjayneth Chee were crowned Mr. and Ms. Chinatown 2022.

November
 November 4 – Kylie Verzosa wins Best Actress for her role in The Housemaid at the Distinctive International Arab Festivals Awards (DIAFA) 2022.
 November 7 – The Binibining Pilipinas Organization announces that they are no longer renewing their franchise with the Miss Grand International (MGI) pageant.
 November 10 – Wanderlust Travel Magazine names Palawan as the world's "Most Desirable Island" for 2022.
 November 11 – Actor, singer, and television presenter Billy Crawford wins the twelfth season of the French version of the competition series Dancing with the Stars.
 November 17 – Disney+, a streaming service owned by Disney Media and Entertainment Distribution (a division of The Walt Disney Company), is launched in the country.
 November 24 – Miss Grand International and ALV Pageant Circle launches the Miss Grand Philippines pageant at Hilton Manila.
 November 25:
 Mister Philippines Jovy Bequillo is crowned Man Hot Star International, which was held in Bangkok, Thailand.
 Miss Philippines Maria Angelica Pantaliano is crowned Miss Tourism Metropolitan International 2022, which was held in Malaysia.
 November 29 – Miss Philippines Jenny Ramp finishes in the Top 20 of Miss Earth 2022 at its pageant final night held in Okada Manila in Parañaque.
 November 30 – Miss Philippines Meiji Cruz won the Miss CosmoWorld 2022 pageant in Malaysia.

December
 December 1 – The first part of the annual Asian Television Awards, for the Entertainment and Performance categories, is held at the Aliw Theater in Pasay. The second will be held in Singapore a week later.
 December 2 – Actress Coleen Garcia wins the Best Actress award at the 2022 El Grito International Fantastic Film Festival in Venezuela for her performance in the suspense-thriller film Kaluskos.
 December 8 – Actress Jodi Sta. Maria wins Best Actress at the 2022 Asian Academy Creative Awards for her role as Dr. Jill Illustre in the network's adaptation of the British drama series Doctor Foster, locally titled The Broken Marriage Vow.
 December 10:
 Maalaala Mo Kaya, Asia's longest-running drama anthology which premiered in 1991, airs its final episode.
 Miss Philippines Justine Felizarta wins the title of 1st runner-up in the Miss Tourism World 2022 pageant which was held in Vietnam.
 December 12 – Miss Philippines Beatriz McLelland wins the title of 1st runner-up in the Miss Eco Teen International 2022 which was held in Egypt.
 December 13 – Miss Philippines Hannah Arnold finishes in the top 15 at the Miss International 2022 pageant in Tokyo, Japan.

Sports

 May 12–23 – The Philippines participates at the 31st Southeast Asian Games in Vietnam, finishing at fourth overall with 52 gold, 70 silver, and 104 bronze medals.

Deaths

January
 January 1 – Merlin Magallona (b. 1935), former law dean of the University of the Philippines
 January 2 – Rudy Fernandez (b. 1949), triathlete
 January 3 – Sigfreid Barros-Sanchez (b. 1976), scriptwriter and filmmaker
 January 6:
 F. Sionil Jose (b. 1924), writer and National Artist for Literature
 Samuel K. Tan (b. 1933), former chairperson and executive director of the National Historical Institute
 Maria Victoria Carpio-Bernido (b. 1961), 2010 Ramon Magsaysay Award recipient
 January 10 – Lisandro Abadia (b. 1938), former Chief of Staff of the Armed Forces of the Philippines
 January 14:
 Augusto "Gus" Villanueva (b. 1939), People's Journal co-founder and editor-in-chief
 Maoi Roca (b. 1975), basketball player and actor
 January 18 – Ernesto "Don Pepot" Fajardo (b. 1933), comedian
 January 21 – Salvador "Mr. Romantiko" Royales (b. 1947), head of the DZRH Drama Division
 January 23:
 Roberto Romulo (b. 1938), former Secretary of Foreign Affairs (1992–1995)
 Romano Vasquez (b. 1971), former actor and singer
 January 29:
 Wowie Vito (b. 1975), former vice mayor and councilor of Majayjay, Laguna
 Gabino Ganggangan (b. 1962), mayor of Sadanga, Mountain Province
 January 30 – Valerio Lopez (b. 1926), former basketball player and coach

February
 February 2 – Rustica Carpio (b. 1930), actress and playwright
 February 9 – Johanna Uy (b. 1980), underwater hockey player
 February 15 – Dong Puno (b. 1946), Press Secretary (2000–2001) and broadcaster
 February 17 – Florencio Flores, Jr. (b. 1949), mayor of Malaybalay, Bukidnon
 February 18 – Ambalang Ausalin (b. 1943), master weaver in Lamitan, Basilan
 February 20 – Jose Fabian Cadiz (b. 1961), former vice mayor of Marikina
 February 21:
 Jomer "OG Kaybee" Galicia (b. 1988), rapper
 Eduardo Roy, Jr. (b. 1980), film director
 February 22 – Charlie Cojuangco (b. 1963), representative of Tarlac's 1st congressional district

March
 March 5 – Luz Fernandez (b. 1935), actress
 March 7 – Camar Umpa (b. 1949), educator, first chancellor of Mindanao State University–Iligan Institute of Technology, and former president of Mindanao State University System
 March 8 – Kidlat de Guia (b. 1975/76), known cinematographer, photographer and visual artist; son of Kidlat Tahimik
 March 13 – Antonio Nachura (b. 1941), former Associate Justice of the Supreme Court
 March 16 – David B. Tirol (b. 1933), former governor of Bohol
 March 17 – Bobby Nalzaro (b. 1963), broadcaster
 March 22 – Eva Castillo (b. 1969), singer
 March 25 – Keith Martin (b. 1966), singer
 March 29 – Jun Lopito (b. 1958), guitarist

April
 April 7 – Carlos Salazar (b. 1930), actor and singer
 April 12 – Irineo Odoy (b. 1923), pioneer of the UP Ikot jeepney route
 April 15 – Eric Suguitan (b. 1985), former basketball player
 April 16:
 Boyet Sison (b. 1963), TV host and sports personality
 Gloria Sevilla (b. 1932), actress
 April 19 – Jose Santiago "Chito" Sta. Romana (b. 1948), former Philippine ambassador to China
 April 23:
 Florencio "Flor" Perez (b. 1957), UNTV C-News anchor and sportswriter
 Cris Albert, owner and CEO of Fila Philippines
 April 29 – Marisol Panotes (b. 1946), representative of Camarines Norte's 2nd congressional district

May
 May 5 – Regina Reyes Mandanas (b. 1964), former representative of Marinduque's at-large congressional district (2013–2016)
 May 11:
 Felix Mariano "Fanny Serrano" Fausto Jr. (b. 1950), actor and stylist
 Baltazar Endriga (b. 1939), former chairman and president of the Cultural Center of the Philippines
 May 15 – Miguel Faustmann (b. 1954), actor
 May 20 – Susan Roces (b. 1941), actress
 May 29 – James Cooper (b. 1949), hairstylist and makeup artist

June
 June 8 – Carmen Pedrosa (b. 1941), former director of Philippine Amusement and Gaming Corporation
 June 9 – Mark Shandii Bacolod, (b. 1984), director, producer and talent manager
 June 14 – Alfred Lobo, (b. 1956), journalist, poet, columnist and former president of National Press Club
 June 30 – Rolando Andaya Jr. (b. 1969), former representative of Camarines Sur

July
 July 8 – Angel Lagdameo (b. 1940), Archbishop of Jaro
 July 11:
 Roberto Datahan (b. 1945), former PNP colonel and chieftain of Eskaya people in Bohol.
 Phillip Lazaro (b. 1971), comedian and director
 July 12 – Rolando Atienza (b. 1944), former chairman of Film Development Council of the Philippines
 July 17 – Julius V. Benitez (b. 1977), educator and mathematician, former president of the Mathematical Society of the Philippines in Region 10, 12, and BARMM
 July 23:
 Boy Alano (b. 1941), actor
 Caloy Alde (b. 1961), comedian
 July 24 – Rose Furigay (b. 1964), former mayor of Lamitan, Basilan
 July 29 – Edward Codilla (b. 1960), former mayor of Ormoc (2013–16)
 July 31 – Fidel V. Ramos (b. 1928), 12th President of the Philippines (1992–98)

August
 August 5 – Cherie Gil (b. 1963), actress
 August 10:
 Lydia de Vega (b. 1964), sprinter
 Dong Polistico (b. 1967), former basketball player
 August 11 – Romeo Sulit (b. 1961), former vice mayor of Lobo, Batangas
 August 13 – Melvyn "Panginoon" Calderon (b. 1952), photojournalist and host
 August 17 – Danilo "Totong" Federez (b. 1960), puppeteer
 August 22:
 Romy V. Suzara (b. 1940), film and television director
 Benito Tiamzon (b. 1951), communist leader 
 Wilma Tiamzon (b. 1952), communist leader 
 August 23 – Andrew Fernando (b. 1970), singer and stage performer
 August 24:
 Clarissa "Ilsa" Reyes (b. 1970), catholic media personality and host
 Rene Aranda (b. 1956), editorial cartoonist

September
 September 2 – Nelia Sancho (b. 1951), former beauty queen and activist
 September 10 – Joseph Amangi Nacua (b. 1945), bishop of Ilagan (2008–17)
 September 13 – Victorio Dimagiba (b. 1948), former Trade and Industry undersecretary and radio host
 September 16 – John Susi (b. 1965), former news anchor
 September 21:
 Jose "Joe" Antonio (b. 1953), sports editor of People's Journal
 Susan Henson (b. 1958), former beauty queen and actress
 September 23:
 Alberto Suansing (b. 1952), former chairman of Land Transportation Office
 Joseph Tejada (b. 1990), vice mayor of Narvacan, Ilocos Sur
 September 26 – Frederick Kriekenbeek (b. 1932), exorcist priest and founding member of the Roman Catholic Archdiocese of Cebu–Office of Deliverance and Exorcism

October
 October 3:
 Percival "Percy Lapid" Mabasa (b. 1959), broadcaster and columnist
 Narciso Amansec (b. 1962), former Vice Mayor of Dipaculao, Aurora
 Mon Legaspi (b. 1968), bassist for The Dawn and Wolfgang
 October 7 – Miguel "Bong" Abaigar Jr. (b. 1968), former vice mayor of Calbiga, Samar
 October 9 – Ricardo "Ricky" Silvestre (b. 1957), mayor of Marilao, Bulacan
 October 16 – Jachob "Coco" Rasuman, investment scammer
 October 27 – Gregorio R. Vigilar (b. 1928), former Secretary of Public Works and Highways
 October 28 – Ernida Agpi-Reynoso (b. 1945), former mayor of Tayabas City, Quezon
 October 31 – Danny Javier (b. 1947), singer-songwriter and member of APO Hiking Society

November
 November 11 – Beth Day Romulo (b. 1924), writer and journalist
 November 16 – Arthur Angara (b. 1937), politician and former mayor of Baler, Aurora (1992–2001, 2004–13)
 November 19 – Flora Gasser (b. 1932), actress
 November 23 – Betsy Westendorp-Brias (b. 1927), painter and former member of Binibining Pilipinas executive committee
 November 27 – Nila Aguillo (b. 1949), former mayor of Cabuyao, Laguna (2004–07)
 November 30 – Calixto Cataquiz (b. 1948), former mayor of San Pedro, Laguna (1986–98; 2007–13)

December
 December 1 – Sylvia La Torre (b. 1933), singer and actress
 December 6 – Richard "Ricky" Recto (b. 1962), former vice governor of Batangas
 December 7 – Hector Gomez (b. 1974), actor
 December 9 – Jovit Baldivino (b. 1993), singer
 December 11 – Mercedes Gotianun (b. 1928), co-founder of Filinvest
 December 16 – Jose Maria Sison (b. 1939), founder of Communist Party of the Philippines

See also

Country overviews 
 Philippines
 History of Philippines
 History of modern Philippines
 Outline of Philippines
 Government of Philippines
 Politics of Philippines
 Years in the Philippines
 Timeline of Philippine history

Related timelines for current period 
 2022
 2022 in politics and government
 2020s

References 

 
Philippines
Philippines
2020s in the Philippines
Years of the 21st century in the Philippines